Nicholas Anderson may refer to:
Nicholas Anderson (rower) (born 1975), American rower
Nicholas Longworth Anderson (1838–1892), U.S. Army officer
Nicholas Anderson (politician) (1856–1919), American businessman, farmer, and politician in Wisconsin
Nicholas Anderson (figure skater) in 2009–2010 figure skating season

See also
Nick Anderson (disambiguation)